State Highway 54 (abbreviated SH-54 or OK-54) is a state highway in western Oklahoma. Running north–south, it exists in two parts, which lie at approximately the same longitude. The northern section has two lettered spur routes.

Route descriptions

Southern section
The southern section of State Highway 54 runs for just under ten miles (16 km), entirely within Tillman County. The highway begins at US-70 and runs north. Midway through the route's extent, it passes through the town of Hollister, where it crosses a railroad track. The highway terminates at SH-5 east of Frederick.

Northern section
The northern section of SH-54 runs for 85.5 miles (137.6 km). It begins at US-62 east of Snyder in Kiowa County. From this point, it heads due northward to pass the western terminus of State Highway 49. For  through Cooperton it overlaps State Highway 19. Continuing northward, it crosses over Rainy Mountain Creek. It then intersects State Highway 9 and its business loop near Gotebo. The highway then bridges the Washita River into Washita County.

At Lake Valley, SH-54 serves as the eastern terminus of State Highway 55. After splitting off, SH-54 heads northward, producing two spur routes to Corn and Colony.

The highway next enters Custer County, where it has an interchange with Interstate 40 at exit 80.

History
The northern section of State Highway 54 was first commissioned on April 14, 1941. The original path of the highway began at US-277 in Cyril and proceeded west, intersecting US-62 in Apache. The highway then turned north, paralleling the Caddo–Kiowa county line, then turning east along SH-41. The highway turned north, meeting US-66 near Hydro, then following US-66 west through Weatherford. On the west side of Weatherford, the highway turned north along its current alignment.

SH-54 saw a substantial realignment on October 16, 1945, when it was shifted to the west onto its present alignment from US-62 southeast of Snyder to Weatherford, and on November 5 of that year, the old alignment of the highway was transferred to SH-58. Since then, only maintenance and minor realignment projects have occurred along its length.

The southern section was established in its entirety on October 15, 1956. It has never been connected to the northern SH-54.

Junction list

Southern section

Northern section

Spur routes
SH-54 has two lettered spur routes, both of which branch off the northern section of SH-54. Both were once part of the now-decommissioned SH-69.

References

External links

Southern section at Roadklahoma
Northern section at Roadklahoma
Southern SH-54 at OKHighways
SH-54A at OKHighways
SH-54B at OKHighways

054
Transportation in Tillman County, Oklahoma
Transportation in Kiowa County, Oklahoma
Transportation in Washita County, Oklahoma
Transportation in Custer County, Oklahoma